Al-Wafi is a Hadith collection, by Mohsen Fayz Kashani who a scholar in different fields. It includes all traditions in the Four Books of Shia.

Author

Mohsen Feyz Kashani known as Mulla Muhsin Fayz Kashani was a scholar expert in different fields such as hadith, exegesis, ethics, and in gnosis and intellectual intuition. He was a student of Bahāʾ al-dīn al-ʿĀmilī and Mir Damad and Mulla Sadra. He wrote more than a hundred and twenty books to Persian and Arabic.

Prelude
Fayz Kashani described in the introduction what led him to write this book because the absence of a unique pattern to collect the hadith and Ahkam in the Four Books which were collected hadiths in the different times with various method. Therefore, he authored the book Al-wafi and collected narratives in specific categories, and removed the Repeated items. He made clear the obscure narratives, in terms of their meaning or vocabulary or from others aspect, which needed to brief explanation.

Context
The book includes all traditions in the four books of Shia. Kashani explained and classified them in the book.
He arranged his book on an introduction, 14 volumes, and a conclusion. Each volumes has an introduction and a conclusion. The list of  14 volumes includes:

 Reason and ignorance and tawhid
 Hujja
 Faith and unbelief
 purity and Al-Zaynah
 Salah and Quran and dua
 Zakat and khums and inheritance
 Fasting and Iʿtikāf and treaty
 Hajj and Umrah and pilgrimage
 Enjoining good and forbidding wrong and jurisdiction and witnesses
 Ways of living, jobs and transactions
 Food and drink and luxury
 Marriage in Islam and divorce and birth
 Death and religious duties and wills
 Rawda containing various hadiths

Recitations
Mohammad Alam-al-Hoda, son of Kashani, wrote a commentary on Al-Wafi.

See also
Shia Islam
List of Shia books
Shaikh al-Hur al-Aamili

References

Shia hadith collections